The 2002 Brasil Open was a tennis tournament played on outdoor hard courts in Costa do Sauipe resort, Mata de São João, Brazil that was part of the International Series of the 2002 ATP Tour and of Tier II of the 2002 WTA Tour. The tournament ran from 9 September through 15 September 2002. Gustavo Kuerten and Anastasia Myskina won the singles titles.

Finals

Men's singles

 Gustavo Kuerten defeated  Guillermo Coria 6–7(4–7), 7–5, 7–6(7–2)
 It was Kuerten's only title of the year and the 25th of his career.

Women's singles

 Anastasia Myskina defeated  Eleni Daniilidou 6–3, 0–6, 6–2
 It was Myskina's only title of the year and the 2nd of her career.

Men's doubles

 Scott Humphries /  Mark Merklein defeated  Gustavo Kuerten /  André Sá 6–3, 7–6(7–1)
 It was Humphries's only title of the year and the 3rd of his career. It was Merklein's only title of the year and the 2nd of his career.

Women's doubles

 Virginia Ruano Pascual /  Paola Suárez defeated  Émilie Loit /  Rossana de los Ríos 6–4, 6–1
 It was Ruano Pascual's 7th title of the year and the 20th of her career. It was Suárez's 7th title of the year and the 27th of her career.

External links
 Official website 
 ATP Tournament Profile

 
Brasil Open
Brasil Open
Brasil Open